Demiurg may refer to:

 Demiurge, the deity responsible for the creation of the physical universe and the physical aspect of humanity in some belief systems
 Demiurg (Warhammer 40,000), an alien species in the fictional Warhammer 40,000 universe
 Demiurge Studios, a small video game development house